Sapientia or Sophia is the personification of wisdom in several religions.

Sapientia may also refer to:
 275 Sapientia, a very large Main belt asteroid
 Sancta Sapientia or Hagia Sophia, Istanbul, Turkey
 Sapientia University, Transylvania, Romania
 Sapientia University (Japan), now named St. Thomas University in Amagasaki, Hyogo, Japan
 O Sapientia (O Wisdom), one of the O Antiphons (chants) in Western Christian tradition
 The great desk of the Chief Master at King Edward's School, Birmingham

See also
 Sapient (disambiguation)
 Several Latin phrases, mostly school mottoes